"Where Have All the Cowboys Gone?" is a song by American singer Paula Cole. It was released on March 25, 1997, as the lead single from her second studio album, This Fire. The song is Cole's only top-ten hit on the US Billboard Hot 100, reaching number eight, and was her first top-ten hit in Canada, where it reached number seven. It was additionally a critical success, earning nominations for three Grammy awards: Record of the Year, Song of the Year, and Best Female Pop Vocal Performance.

Style and theme
The song traces the stages of a tragic romance.  The first two verses explore infatuation and discovery; a bridge expresses disillusionment, and a final verse changes to despair. A brief transition and chorus that repeats the song's title follows each verse, and questions the loss of the narrator's idyllic dream of spending her lifetime with a Western-styled hero. The song is written in 4/4 time and maintains a minor key throughout. The verse score is minimalist and includes only low, rasping vocals by Cole with percussion accompaniment, while the choral transitions, chorus, and bridge use the full instrumentation and Cole's mezzo-soprano range.

Music video
The video was directed by Caitlin Felton. It is simple, primarily featuring Cole in the foreground singing or posing for the camera, while her band plays in the background. These shots are augmented by various shadowy or obscure images of people walking, sitting at a table, sitting in a car and riding a horse. There are several points where the video looks grainy, adding to the effect of the song.

The video was nominated for Best Female Video at the 1997 MTV Video Music Awards, losing to Jewel's "You Were Meant for Me".

Accolades
The song received Grammy nominations for Best Female Pop Vocal Performance (losing to Sarah McLachlan's "Building a Mystery"), Record of the Year, and Song of the Year (losing both to "Sunny Came Home" by Shawn Colvin).

Track listings
US 7-inch and cassette single
A. "Where Have All the Cowboys Gone?" (edit) – 3:46
B. "Hush, Hush, Hush." (album version) – 4:22

UK and European CD single
 "Where Have All the Cowboys Gone?" (album version edit) – 3:47
 "Hush, Hush, Hush." (album version) – 4:23
 "Where Have All the Cowboys Gone?" (E-Team Drugstore Cowboy Radio Edit) – 3:57

Australian CD single
 "Where Have All the Cowboys Gone?" (album version edit)
 "Where Have All the Cowboys Gone?" (E-Team Drugstore Cowboy Radio Edit)
 "Where Have All the Cowboys Gone?" (Sylkscreen Radio Edit)
 "Where Have All the Cowboys Gone?" (Dekkard's Rancho Pepe Mix)
 "Where Have All the Cowboys Gone?" (E-Team Saxuality Mix)

Charts

Weekly charts

Year-end charts

Release history

References

1996 songs
1997 singles
Imago Records singles
Paula Cole songs
Songs about cowboys and cowgirls
Songs written by Paula Cole
Warner Records singles